"Yayo" is a song by American rapper Snootie Wild, taken from his debut EP Go Mode as his debut single. The song was released on Collective Music Group and Epic Records. "Yayo" also features a guest appearance by Collective Music Group founder Yo Gotti and was produced by Krazy Figz. The song has since peaked at number 30 on the US Billboard Hot R&B/Hip-Hop Songs chart.

Background 
The song was originally released as a solo Snootie Wild song in 2013. It then spawned an unofficial remix by rapper T.I., which would then catch the ear of Yo Gotti. Gotti would then sign Wild to his CMG record label, which is distributed through Epic Records.

Music video 
Snootie Wild released the music video for "Yayo" in March 2014.

Remix 
The official remix of "Yayo" featuring Fabolous, French Montana, Jadakiss, and YG was released on May 13, 2014. The remix then appeared on CMG's first collective  compilation project titled Chapter One, which was released on May 22, 2014.

Charts

Weekly charts

Year-end charts

Certifications

References 

2013 songs
2014 singles
Yo Gotti songs
Epic Records singles
Songs about cocaine
Snootie Wild songs
Songs written by Yo Gotti